Úněšov is a municipality and village in Plzeň-North District in the Plzeň Region of the Czech Republic. It has about 600 inhabitants.

Administrative parts
Villages of Budeč, Čbán, Číhaná, Hvožďany, Lípa, Podmokly, Štipoklasy and Vojtěšín are administrative parts of Úněšov.

References

Villages in Plzeň-North District